Leon Belleth was a popular announcer with Radio Ceylon and subsequently the Sri Lanka Broadcasting Corporation. He presented a range of radio programs including Holiday Choice. Listeners enjoyed his free and easy style of broadcasting. Leon Belleth was educated at one of Sri Lanka's foremost educational institutions - Royal College Colombo. He was introduced to radio by the veteran broadcaster, Vernon Corea who mentored him while he was in Radio Ceylon.

Leon Belleth now lives in Australia where he is still involved in broadcasting with Australian radio stations.

See also
Radio Ceylon
Sri Lanka Broadcasting Corporation
List of Sri Lankan broadcasters
Vernon Corea
Royal College Colombo
List of Royal College Colombo alumni

External links 
 Sri Lanka Broadcasting Corporation
 SLBC-creating new waves of history
Eighty Years of Broadcasting in Sri Lanka

Living people
Sri Lankan radio personalities
Alumni of Royal College, Colombo
Australian people of Sri Lankan descent
Year of birth missing (living people)